Josefa Berens-Totenohl (30 March 1891, in Grevenstein, Sauerland – 6 June 1969) was a German writer and painter.
She was the daughter of a blacksmith. First she became a teacher, but later worked as a writer and painter and made elaborate tapestries.  Her romantic peasant novels were very popular in Nazi Germany; although she never joined the Nazi Party, and the novels had no ideological overtones, their praise of peasant virtue,  rootedness, and strength were acceptable to the party.

See also
 List of German painters

References

External links
 

1891 births
1969 deaths
People from Meschede
People from the Province of Westphalia
Writers from North Rhine-Westphalia
German women novelists
20th-century German painters
German women painters
20th-century German novelists
20th-century German women writers